William L. A. Hinds is a proponent scientist for renewable energy sources in the West Indies and advisor to the Prime Minister of Barbados.

Hinds was awarded the British Government's Chevening Scholarship in 1984 where he gained a Masters of Science in Alternate Energy from the University of Reading, which covers the entire spectrum of Alternate Energy. Hinds was also a recipient of the International Visitor Leadership Programme provide by the United States Department of State in 2008.

Youth and education
Hinds was born in Barbados He received his secondary education at Harrison College in Barbados, and studied at the University of the West Indies, Cave Hill Campus where he obtained a Bachelor of Science Degree in Natural Sciences.

On completing his postgraduate studies, he returned to Barbados and began working on Organization of American States (OAS) and Inter-American Development Bank (IADB) projects in the area of Bio-gas Digesters and Wind Energy. The Wind project included the development of Grid Stability Studies and Wind Resource Mapping on site selection. The Barbados Project was the largest wind turbine in the Caribbean in the 1980s.

Career in industry
By 1990 Hinds started a company to produce solar dryers which could be used for both agriculture and industrial purposes. The first challenge of this technology was solving a problem relating to the shelf life of a cream of wheat type product that lasted no more than two months. Hinds produced a walk-in solar dryer with computerized temperature controls and back up heating, that dried the produce enough for it to have a 12-month shelf life, with the added benefit of making it an exportable product.

Between 1990 and 1996 he developed a solar dryer to dry imported lumber for the local furniture industry. Hinds then joined the University of the West Indies (UWI), Cave Hill Campus as project manager of the Solar Programme in 1996, developing solar dryers, solar stills and installing most of the solar electric systems commissioned by the Barbados Government, at the time.

In 2004, Hinds introduced Barbados' first solar electric vehicle, a solar powered golf cart, which came a few years after Hinds introduced Barbados’ first solar powered bicycle. This was followed by solar shuttles used as the first of its kind in Barbados and the Caribbean to give tours of the capital city using solar vehicles. Hinds was invited by the Government of Trinidad and Tobago to ship one of these vehicles to be used at the Commonwealth Heads of Government Meeting 2009.

Hinds developed, and taught Barbados’ first ever PV installation courses to over 100 participants from four Caribbean countries. This benefit was then exported to Belize, where Hinds trained 27 persons in that country, and 20 staff of the Anguilla electric utility. He conceptualized and designed multimillion-dollar regional renewable energy projects, which attracted support from over 13 Caribbean countries and the Global Environmental Facility. This project evolved into the Caribbean Renewable Energy Development Project which is based at the CARICOM Secretariat, Guyana.

Hinds helped develop the Caribbean's first large scale solar powered ice plant in Skeete's Bay, St Philip, Barbados; Barbados' first solar demonstration house, which is on display in Queen's Park, Bridgetown; and Trinidad's first solar demonstration house located at the University of Trinidad and Tobago.

Hinds is a speaker and author. He wrote Householders Guide to Cool Solar Houses and Garden Adventure, How a Solar Water Heater works.

Career in government
Between 1990 and 1996, Hinds worked as a development officer for the Canadian International Development Agency (CIDA).

Hinds serves as Chief Energy Conservation Officer in the Energy and Telecommunications Division in the Office of the Prime Minister.

Personal
Hinds has two sons.

References

Living people
1961 births